C. David Campbell Field (Corsicana Municipal Airport)  is six miles southeast of downtown Corsicana, in Navarro County, Texas It provides general aviation service.

History
Opened on 1 April 1941  with 2,000' all-way turf runway. Known as Corsicana Field.  Assigned to United States Army Air Forces Gulf Coast Training Center (later Central Flying Training Command) as a primary (level 1) pilot training airfield. had six local axillary airfields for emergency and overflow landings.

Began training United States Army Air Corps flying cadets under contract to Air Activities of Texas under 301st Flying Training Detachment. Flying training was performed with Fairchild PT-19s as the primary trainer. Also had several PT-17 Stearmans and a few old A-3 Curtiss Falcons assigned.

Inactivated on 16 October 1944 with the drawdown of AAFTC's pilot training program. Declared surplus and turned over to the Army Corps of Engineers on 30 September 1945. Eventually discharged to the War Assets Administration (WAA) and became a civil airport.

Facilities
It has two runways: 14/32 is 5,004 by 75 feet (1,525 x 23 m) asphalt; 2/20 is 3,200 by 75 feet (975 x 23 m) turf.

In the year ending May 5, 2010 the airport had 7,800 general aviation aircraft operations, average 21 per day. 49 aircraft were then based at the airport: 86% single-engine, 6% multi-engine, 6% helicopter and 2% ultralight.

See also

 Texas World War II Army Airfields
 31st Flying Training Wing (World War II)

References

External links 
 

1941 establishments in Texas
Airfields of the United States Army Air Forces in Texas
Airports in Texas
Buildings and structures in Navarro County, Texas
USAAF Contract Flying School Airfields
Transportation in Navarro County, Texas
Airports established in 1941